The Volvo Dealer Team was an Australian motor racing team that competed in Australian touring car racing in 1986 winning the Australian Touring Car Championship.

The team was managed by John Sheppard and had its base at the Calder Park Raceway in Melbourne.

History
New Zealand based driver Robbie Francevic won the opening round of the opening two rounds of the 1986 Australian Touring Car Championship, driving the Mark Petch Motorsport Volvo 240T that he had campaigned in Australia throughout 1985. Auckland based millionaire businessmen Mark Petch then sold the team to Volvo Australia and it was re-branded as the Volvo Dealer Team with former Holden Dealer Team manager John Sheppard appointed to lead the team. The team added a new right hand drive 240T purchased from Europe from Round 4 of the championship in Adelaide for Francevic to drive while his 1985 endurance co-driver John Bowe joined the team full time and drove the original left hand drive car. Francevic's win in Adelaide would prove to be the only race win for the short lived team.

Francevic would go on to win the ATCC, the first time the championship would be won by a turbo powered car and the first time it would be won by a non-Australian resident (Francevic continued to live in Auckland and only commuted to Australia for races and some private testing). However simmering tensions between the big Kiwi and Sheppard, with Francevic being unhappy about the increasing uncompetitiveness of the 240T against the new V8 Group A Holden Commodore and turbo Nissan Skyline's which meant he won the title with consistent placings rather than the race wins he wanted, would boil over at the Sandown 500 with Francevic being fired by Sheppard the day after the race following his refusal to drive a newly built car (claiming it would be uncompetitive having not even practiced) as well as his controversial comments to the media on the morning of the race.

All of this elevated dual Australian Drivers' Champion Bowe to lead driver in his first full season of touring car racing. Bowe was joined in the lead car for the 1986 James Hardie 1000 at Bathurst by his former open wheel rival Alfredo Costanzo while the second car would be driven by New Zealand drivers Graham McRae and Neville Crichton. Bowe qualified his 240T in 5th place, but a troubled run for the team saw the lead car out of the race on lap 113 while the second car finished 7 laps down in 11th place.

At the end of 1986, Volvo withdrew from global motorsport resulting in the team being disbanded and the cars being returned to Sweden.

References

Australian auto racing teams
Auto racing teams established in 1986
Sports clubs disestablished in 1986
Sports teams in Victoria (Australia)
1986 establishments in Australia
1986 disestablishments in Australia